De Krant op Zondag (The Newspaper on Sunday) was a Dutch Sunday newspaper which was launched on 14 October 1990.

On 10 May 1992 the final issue appeared. The editor-in-chief was René de Bok. De Krant op Zondag went into administration because of distribution problems and lack of advertisers. De Bok wrote a book about making the paper.

References

1990 establishments in the Netherlands
1992 disestablishments in the Netherlands
Dutch-language newspapers
Defunct newspapers published in the Netherlands
Publications established in 1990
Publications disestablished in 1992
Sunday newspapers
Weekly newspapers published in the Netherlands